Slope stability refers to the condition of inclined soil or rock slopes to withstand or undergo movement; the opposite condition is called slope instability or slope failure. The stability condition of slopes is a subject of study and research in soil mechanics, geotechnical engineering and engineering geology. Analyses are generally aimed at understanding the causes of an occurred slope failure, or the factors that can potentially trigger a slope movement, resulting in a landslide, as well as at preventing the initiation of such movement, slowing it down or arresting it through mitigation countermeasures.

The stability of a slope is essentially controlled by the ratio between the available shear strength and the acting shear stress, which can be expressed in terms of a safety factor if these quantities are integrated over a potential (or actual) sliding surface. A slope can be globally stable if the safety factor, computed along any potential sliding surface running from the top of the slope to its toe, is always larger than 1. The smallest value of the safety factor will be taken as representing the global stability condition of the slope. Similarly, a slope can be locally stable if a safety factor larger than 1 is computed along any potential sliding surface running through a limited portion of the slope (for instance only within its toe). Values of the global or local safety factors close to 1 (typically comprised between 1 and 1.3, depending on regulations) indicate marginally stable slopes that require attention, monitoring and/or an engineering intervention (slope stabilization) to increase the safety factor and reduce the probability of a slope movement.
A previously stable slope can be affected by a number of predisposing factors or processes that make the safety factor decrease - either by increasing the shear stress or by decreasing the shear strength - and can ultimately result in slope failure. Factors that can trigger slope failure include hydrologic events (such as intense or prolonged rainfall, rapid snowmelt, progressive soil saturation, increase of water pressure within the slope), earthquakes (including aftershocks), internal erosion (piping), surface or toe erosion, artificial slope loading (for instance due to the construction of a building), slope cutting (for instance to make space for roadways, railways or buildings), or slope flooding (for instance by filling an artificial lake after damming a river).

Examples 

Earthen slopes can develop a cut-spherical weakness area. The probability of this happening can be calculated in advance using a simple 2-D circular analysis package. A primary difficulty with analysis is locating the most-probable slip plane for any given situation. Many landslides have only been analyzed after the fact.  More recently slope stability radar technology has been employed, particularly in the mining industry, to gather real time data and assist in determining the likelihood of slope failure.

Real life failures in naturally deposited mixed soils are not necessarily circular, but prior to computers, it was far easier to analyze such a simplified geometry.  Nevertheless, failures in 'pure' clay can be quite close to circular.  Such slips often occur after a period of heavy rain, when the pore water pressure at the slip surface increases, reducing the effective normal stress and thus diminishing the restraining friction along the slip line.  This is combined with increased soil weight due to the added groundwater.  A 'shrinkage' crack (formed during prior dry weather) at the top of the slip may also fill with rain water, pushing the slip forward.  At the other extreme, slab-shaped slips on hillsides can remove a layer of soil from the top of the underlying bedrock.  Again, this is usually initiated by heavy rain, sometimes combined with increased loading from new buildings or removal of support at the toe (resulting from road widening or other construction work).  Stability can thus be significantly improved by installing drainage paths to reduce the destabilizing forces.  Once the slip has occurred, however, a weakness along the slip circle remains, which may then recur at the next monsoon.

Angle of repose
The angle of repose is related to the shear strength of geologic materials, which is relevant in construction and engineering contexts. For granular materials, the size and shape of grains can impact angle of repose significantly. As the roundness of materials increases, the angle of repose decreases since there is less friction between the soil grains.

When the angle of repose is exceeded, mass wasting and rockfall can occur. It is important for many civil and geotechnical engineers to know the angle of repose to avoid structural and natural disasters. As a result, the application of retaining walls can help to retain soil so that the angle of repose is not exceeded.

The angle of repose and the stability of a slope are impacted by climatic and non-climatic factors.

Water content 
Water content is an important parameter that could change the angle of repose. Reportedly, a higher water content can stabilize a slope and increase the angle of repose. However, water saturation can result in a decrease in the slope's stability since it acts as a lubricant and creates a detachment where mass wasting can occur.

Water content is dependent on soil properties such as grain size, which can impact infiltration rate, runoff, and water retention. Generally, finer-grained soils rich in clay and silt retain more water than coarser sandy soils. This effect is mainly due to capillary action, where the adhesive forces between the fluid, particle, and the cohesive forces of the fluid itself counteract gravitational pull. Therefore,  smaller grain size results in a smaller surface area on which gravitational forces can act. Smaller surface area also leads to more capillary action, more water retention, more infiltration, and less runoff.

Vegetation 
The presence of vegetation does not directly impact the angle of repose, but it acts as a stabilizing factor in a hillslope, where the tree roots anchor into deeper soil layers and form a fiber‐reinforced soil composite with a higher shear resistance (mechanical cohesion).

Roundness of grains 
The shape of the grain can have an impact on the angle of repose and the stability of the slope. The more rounded the grain is, the lower the angle of repose. A decrease in roundness, or an increase in angularity, results in interlocking via particle contact. This linear relationship between the angle of repose and the roundness of grain can also be used as a predictor of the angle of repose if the roundness of the grain is measured.

Slope stabilization 

Since the stability of the slope can be impacted by external events such as precipitation, an important concern in civil/geotechnical engineering is the stabilization of slopes.

Application of vegetation 

The application of vegetation to increase the slope stability against erosion and landslide is a form of bioengineering that is widely used in areas where the landslide depth is shallow. Vegetation increases the stability of the slope mechanically, by reinforcing the soils through plant roots, which stabilize the upper part of the soil. Vegetation also stabilizes the slope via hydrologic processes, by the reduction of soil moisture content through the interception of precipitation and transpiration. This results in a drier soil that is less susceptible to mass wasting.

Stability of slopes can also be improved by:
 Flattening of slopes results in reduction in weight which makes the slope more stable
 Soil stabilization
 Providing lateral supports by piles or retaining walls
 Grouting or cement injections into specific zones
 Consolidation by surcharging or electro osmosis increases the stability of slope

Analysis methods

Mass classification and rating

Various classification and rating systems exist for the design of slopes and to assess the stability of slopes. The systems are based on empirical relations between rock mass parameters and various slope parameters such as height and slope dip.

Probability classification
The slope stability probability classification (SSPC) system is a rock mass classification system for slope engineering and slope stability assessment. The system is a three-step classification: ‘exposure’, ‘reference’, and ‘slope’ rock mass classification with conversion factors between the three steps depending on existing and future weathering and damage due to method of excavation. The stability of a slope is expressed as probability for different failure mechanisms.

A rock mass is classified following a standardized set of criteria in one or more exposures (‘exposure’ classification). These values are converted per exposure to a ‘reference’ rock mass by compensating for the degree of weathering in the exposure and the method of excavation that was used to make the exposure, i.e. the ‘reference’ rock mass values are not influenced by local influences such as weathering and method of excavation. A new slope can then be designed in the ‘reference’ rock mass with compensation for the damage due to the method of excavation to be used for making the new slope and compensation for deterioration of the rock mass due to future weathering (the ‘slope’ rock mass). If the stability of an already existing slope is assessed the ‘exposure’ and ‘slope’ rock mass values are the same.

The failure mechanisms are divided in orientation dependent and orientation independent. Orientation dependent failure mechanisms depend on the orientation of the slope with respect to the orientation of the discontinuities in the rock mass, i.e. sliding (plane and wedge sliding) and toppling failure. Orientation independent relates to the possibility that a slope fails independently from its orientation, e.g. circular failure completely through newly formed discontinuities in intact rock blocks, or failing partially following existing discontinuities and partially new discontinuities.

In addition the shear strength along a discontinuity ('sliding criterion') and 'rock mass cohesion' and 'rock mass friction' can be determined. The system has been used directly or modified in various geology and climate environments throughout the world.  The system has been modified for slope stability assessment in open pit coal mining.

See also 
 Deformation monitoring
 Retaining wall
 Slope stability radar
 Stereonet

References

Further reading 

 Coduto, Donald P. (1998). Geotechnical Engineering: Principles and Practices. Prentice-Hall. 
 Fredlund, D. G., H. Rahardjo, M. D. Fredlund (2014). Unsaturated Soil Mechanics in Engineering Practice. Wiley-Interscience.

External links
 

Landslide analysis, prevention and mitigation